Lai Ching is one of the 37 constituencies in the Kwun Tong District of Hong Kong which was created in 1991.

The constituency has an estimated population of 15,349.

Councillors represented

Election results

2010s

References

Constituencies of Hong Kong
Constituencies of Kwun Tong District Council
1994 establishments in Hong Kong
Constituencies established in 1994
Kowloon Bay